The term European Day or Europe Day is an annual celebration of peace and unity in Europe.

It can also mean: 
 Europe Day
 European Day of the Entrepreneur
 European Day of Languages
 European Day of Mourning
 European Day of Remembrance for Victims of Stalinism and Nazism
 European Day of Jewish Culture 
 European Maritime Day
 European Heritage Day